Ogé Beauvoir (born 1956) has been Suffragan Bishop of the Episcopal Diocese of Haiti since 2012.

Biography
Beauvoir was born in Gros-Morne, Haiti, and educated in Montreal before ordination in the Anglican Church of Canada. He was received into the Episcopal Church in 2000 and served as an Episcopal Church-appointed missionary to Haiti from 2004 to 2012. He also served in that capacity from 1991 to 1996.

External links 
Ogé Beauvoir becomes Haiti’s bishop suffragan

1956 births
Living people
21st-century Anglican bishops in the United States
People from Artibonite (department)
Haitian Anglicans
Episcopal bishops of Haiti
Haitian Christian clergy